Looni is a town and union council in Kulachi Tehsil Dera Ismail Khan District of Khyber-Pakhtunkhwa.

References

Union councils of Dera Ismail Khan District
Populated places in Dera Ismail Khan District